The American Meteorological Society (AMS) is the premier scientific and professional organization in the United States promoting and disseminating information about the atmospheric, oceanic, and hydrologic sciences. Its mission is to advance the atmospheric and related sciences, technologies, applications, and services for the benefit of society.

Background 
Founded on December 29, 1919, by Charles Franklin Brooks at a meeting of the American Association for the Advancement of Science in St. Louis and incorporated on January 21, 1920, the American Meteorological Society has a membership of more than 13,000 weather, water, and climate scientists, professionals, researchers, educators, students, and enthusiasts.

AMS offers numerous programs and services in the sphere of water, weather and climate sciences. It publishes eleven atmospheric and related oceanic and hydrologic journals (in print and online), sponsors as many as twelve conferences annually, and administers professional certification programs and awards. The AMS Policy and Education programs promote scientific knowledge and work to increase public understanding of science. There is also an extensive network of local and student AMS chapters.

AMS headquarters is located at 45 Beacon Street adjacent to the Boston Common in Boston, Massachusetts. The headquarters building was designed by Charles Bulfinch as the third Harrison Gray Otis House in 1806 and was purchased and renovated by AMS in 1958, with staff moving into the building in 1960. In 2012, AMS purchased the building next door at 44 Beacon Street, also designed by Bulfinch.  AMS also maintains an office in Washington, D.C., at 1200 New York Avenue NW inside the AAAS headquarters.

The American Meteorological Society is not to be confused with the American Meteor Society, a group of volunteers who observe and track meteors and fireballs.

Certification programs 
AMS maintains professional certification programs: the Certified Broadcast Meteorologist (CBM) sets a professional standard in broadcast meteorology and the Certified Consulting Meteorologist (CCM) establishes high standards of technical competence, character, and experience for consultants who provide advice in meteorology to the public. The AMS Seal of Approval was launched in 1957 to recognize on-air meteorologists for their sound delivery of weather information to the general public. Many seal holders are still active, though the original Seal was succeeded by the CBM. Those looking for an expert can consult the listings of all AMS Certified individuals.  A recent addition is the Certified AMS Teacher (CAT), a graduate-level certificate for K-12 teachers.

Awards 
AMS recognizes excellent work with over 30 different awards ranging from outstanding research contributions in specific fields to awards for excellence in teaching or broadcasting, outstanding books, exceptional service in forecasting, and more including its highest honor: the Carl-Gustaf Rossby Medal.

AMS also awards more than $100,000 annually in undergraduate and graduate level scholarships and fellowships.

Publications 
AMS publishes eleven peer reviewed scientific journals, as well as books, and monographs, accounting for more than 34,000 pages each year. AMS journals are consistently ranked at or near the top of their fields for impact factor.

 Bulletin of the American Meteorological Society (BAMS)
 Journal of the Atmospheric Sciences (JAS)
 Journal of Applied Meteorology and Climatology (JAMC)
 Journal of Physical Oceanography (JPO)
 Monthly Weather Review (MWR)
 Journal of Atmospheric and Oceanic Technology (JTECH)
 Weather and Forecasting (WAF)
 Journal of Climate (JCLI)
 Journal of Hydrometeorology (JHM)
 Weather, Climate, and Society (WCAS)
 Earth Interactions (EI) (co-published with AGU & AAG)
 Meteorological Monographs

In addition, AMS publishes the Glossary of Meteorology; a blog; and the scientific database Meteorological and Geoastrophysical Abstracts.

AMS is a member of Crossref, Portico, CHORUS, and CLOCKSS.

Policy Program 
The AMS Policy Program works to increase public understanding of the role of scientific information in societal advancement and helps policy-makers ground their decisions in the best available scientific knowledge. It carries out research, holds periodic briefings that allow experts to inform policy makers directly on established scientific understanding and the latest policy-relevant research, and hosts an annual Summer Policy Colloquium to introduce Earth scientists to the federal policy process. The Congressional Science Fellowship places an AMS scientist on the staff of a member of Congress for one full year.

Statements 
AMS issues and periodically updates four different types of statements on topics that fall within the scope of AMS expertise:
 Information statements aim to provide a trustworthy, objective and scientifically up-to-date explanation of scientific issues of concern to the public at large. They deal with subjects such as climate change and drought.
 Policy statements are aimed at officials of government or international bodies and may articulate the state of scientific understanding, raise awareness of a scientific issue, or make policy recommendations based on the professional and scientific expertise and perspectives of the AMS (examples: Weather, Water, and Climate Priorities; Geoengineering the Climate System; Space Weather)
 Professional guidance statements alert AMS members to urgent or important AMS, professional or scientific matters.  (examples: Strengthening Social Sciences in the Weather–Climate Enterprise; Green Meetings)
 Best Practice statements inform AMS members and the public about AMS endorsed best practices across the weather, water, and climate enterprise and promote scientifically-based standards and practices. (example: Best Practices for Publicly Sharing Weather Information Via Social Media)

Meetings and events 
AMS organizes a large number national and international meetings, specialized conferences and workshops. Annually, more than 6,000 people attend AMS meetings covering science, technology and applications in the atmospheric and related oceanographic and hydrologic sciences. In addition to the AMS Annual Meeting, the 98th of which was held in Austin, Texas in 2018, a number of specialty meetings are held each year. AMS records oral presentations given at its meetings and posts them online for anyone to view free of charge.

Over thirty conferences and symposia are held concurrently during the AMS Annual Meeting, during which more than 2000 Oral Presentations are given, and more than 1000 Posters are presented. The AMS Annual Meeting also features an exhibits program, where companies and organizations participate.

Education Program 
The AMS Education Program offers training, workshops, and undergraduate course curriculum to educate the next generation and increase scientific literacy. It claims to have trained over 100,000 teachers.

AMS partners with NOAA, NASA the NSF and the U.S. Navy to offer a suite of teacher professional development programs, including three DataStreme courses, Project ATMOSPHERE, and the Maury Project. Textbooks and Investigations Manuals used in AMS DataStreme and Undergraduate Courses are dynamic eBooks with web-based features. Many AMS members contribute to the creation and editing of course materials.

Membership 
The American Meteorological Society has more than 13,000 individual members in nearly 100 countries. Membership was initially limited to professionals or scholars in the atmospheric or related sciences, but today an array of membership categories accommodate a wide range of people including students, teachers, corporations and weather enthusiasts.

Fellows
Fellows of the AMS are those who "have made outstanding contributions to the atmospheric or related oceanic or hydrologic sciences or their applications during a substantial period of years". They are elected annually. , 1195 members had been appointed as fellows, of whom 327 were deceased and 150 inactive.

Presidents 
The following AMS members served as presidents of the society during the listed periods:

 Robert DeCourcy Ward, 1920–21
 Robert Frederic Stupart, 1922–23
 Willis Isbister Milham, 1924–25
 Charles Frederick Marvin, 1926–27
 William Jackson Humphreys, 1928–29
 John M. Patterson, 1930–31
 Herbert Harvey Kimball, 1932–33
 Isaac Monroe Cline, 1934–35
 Joseph Burton Kincer, 1936–37
 Willis Ray Gregg, 1938
 Robert Elmer Horton, 1938–39
 Francis Wilton Reichelderfer, 1940–41
 Bernhard Haurwitz, 1943
 Edward Hall Bowie, 1942–43
 Carl-Gustaf Arvid Rossby, 1944–45
 Henry Garrett Houghton, 1946–47
 Howard T. Orville, 1948–49
 Donald Norton Yates, 1950–51
 Horace Robert Byers, 1952–53
 Arthur Francis Merewether, 1954–55
 Robert D. Fletcher, 1956–57
 Sverre Petterssen, 1958–59
 Thomas F. Malone, 1960–61
 Morris Neiburger, 1962–63
 Philip Duncan Thompson, 1964–65
 Louis Joseph Battan, 1966–67
 Verner Edward Suomi, 1968
 George S. Benton, 1969
 Eugene Bollay, 1970
 Alfred Kimball Blackadar, 1971
 Richard J. Reed, 1972
 William Welch Kellogg, 1973
 David Simonds Johnson, 1974
 David Atlas, 1975
 Charles Luther Hosler, 1976
 Werner A. Baum, 1977
 George P. Cressman, 1978
 Chester Whittier Newton, 1979
 Robert M. White, 1980
 Robert Guthrie Fleagle, 1981
 Richard E. Hallgren, 1982
 Earl George Droessler, 1983
 Eugene W. Bierly, 1984
 Clifford J. Murino, 1985
 Joseph Smagorinsky, 1986
 Albert J. Kaehn Jr., 1987
 Roscoe R. Braham, 1988
 Joanne Simpson, 1989
 James R. Mahoney, 1990
 William D. Bonner, 1991
 Donald R. Johnson, 1992
 Robert T. Ryan, 1993
 Warren M. Washington, 1994
 David D. Houghton, 1995
 Paul D. Try, 1996
 Ronald D. McPherson, 1997
 Eugene M. Rasmusson, 1998
 George L. Frederick Jr., 1999
 James F. Kimpel, 2000
 Robert J. Serafin, 2001
 Richard D. Rosen, 2002
 Elbert W. Friday Jr., 2003
 Susan K. Avery, 2004
 Walter Andrew Lyons, 2005
 Franco Einaudi, 2006
 Richard A. Anthes, 2007
 Walter F. Dabberdt, 2008
 Thomas R. Karl, 2009
 Margaret Anne LeMone, 2010
 Jonathan T. Malay, 2011
 Louis W. Uccellini, 2012
 J. Marshall Shepherd, 2013
 William B. Gail, 2014
 Alexander E. MacDonald, 2015
 Frederick H. Carr, 2016
 Matthew J. Parker, 2017
 Roger M. Wakimoto, 2018
 Jenni L. Evans, 2019 
 Mary Glackin, 2020
 Michael R. Farrar, 2021
 Richard Dale Clark, 2022

See also 
 American Geophysical Union
 National Weather Association

References

External links 

 
Professional associations based in the United States
Non-profit organizations based in Boston
1919 establishments in the United States
Scientific organizations established in 1919